Putul Kumari (born 16 November 1958) is an Indian politician from Bihar state, who has lost Lok Sabha elections from Banka a couple of times, latest in 2019. She was elected to Lok Sabha from Banka in a by-poll in 2010, after the death of her husband who had won from Banka in 2009 General Election.

Personal life
She is the widow of Digvijay Singh, who previously held the seat. She has two daughters named Mansi Singh and Shreyasi Singh who is her younger daughter. Shreyasi Singh is international-level trap shooter and a politician. Shreyasi Singh had secured 4th rank in 2010 Commonwealth Games held at Delhi and won Gold in 2018 Commonwealth Games.

Childhood and Education
Born on 16 November 1958 at Pali, Patna (Bihar) from father Late Jang Bahadur Singh and mother Smt Lalghari Devi, she completed her M.A. in Hindi from Patna University.

Political career
She won a by-election in 2010 to enter the Lok Sabha for the first time. She took the oath of office on 26 November 2010.

In her maiden speech, during the Railway Budget in March 2011 she asked for more railway lines for her constituency, which is a backward area.

The family has had on-off association with BJP, with both Digvijay Singh and Putul Kumari having fought elections from Banka as BJP candidate as well as independents.

Social and Cultural  activities
She is very active for promoting primary education of
children; organising health camps 
`swasthyaya melas` and mass
marriages of girls belonging to
scheduled castes and scheduled
tribes. She is also associated with (i)
establishment/functioning of
charitable hospitals; and (ii)
Gidhaur Foundation and Gidhaur
Mohotsava Annual Festival celebrated during Durga Puja festival at Gidhaur.

Interests
She works for Reiki (third level completed), working for upliftment of the deprived people. She is also a great fan of sports and games. She is associated with shooting event;she owns membership of Rifle Association of India;she likes practicing yoga and organising yoga sessions. Her favourite pastimes and recreation activities are reading religious literature (OSHO and Swami Satyanand) and fiction;also interested in gardening, devotional music, interior designing; flower arrangement (Ikebana) and fishing.

References

External links
 Putul Kumari, webpage at Lok Sabha

1958 births
Living people
Politicians from Patna
India MPs 2009–2014
Patna University alumni
Lok Sabha members from Bihar
National Democratic Alliance candidates in the 2014 Indian general election
Women in Bihar politics
Bharatiya Janata Party politicians from Bihar
21st-century Indian women politicians
21st-century Indian politicians